Ramamurthy is a surname. Notable people with the surname include:

B. Ramamurthy, Indian director
B. V. Ramamurthy, Indian cartoonist
Gidugu Ramamurthy, also known as Gidugu Venkata Ramamoorty
Kathadi Ramamurthy, Indian actor, director and script writer
Kodi Ramamurthy Naidu, Indian bodybuilder
Nara Ramamurthy Naidu, Indian politician
R. Ramamurthy, Indian politician, incumbent Member of the Tamil Nadu Legislative Assembly from the Vikravandi constituency
Sendhil Ramamurthy, American actor
S. V. Ramamurthy, Indian civil servant
T K Ramamurthy, also known as T. K. Ramamoorthy, a South Indian Tamil music composer and violinist
Vazhappady K. Ramamurthy, Indian politician from Tamil Nadu
Vittal Ramamurthy, violinist in the Carnatic music tradition of South India
V. S. Ramamurthy, Indian nuclear physicist

See also
Ram Murty
Raumurthy